Ngọc Sơn (born November 26, 1970) is a Vietnamese singer, whose career peak was in the 1990s.

Life 
Ngọc Sơn was born in Đồ Sơn, Hai Phong, Vietnam. With Ngoc Hai and Ngoc Ha, two of his brothers, Ngọc Sơn has conducted many music programs. His music ranges from ethnic songs to other genres such as pop, rap, and rock.

Ngọc Sơn was awarded the Voice of the Western Provinces in 1985, Affectionate Singer of 1989 in Nha Trang, and, for his Ngọc Sơn Pop CD 1, the Winners Gold Record in 1997.

References

External links 
 Các album của Ngọc Sơn trên trang vmdb
 Các sáng tác của Ngọc Sơn trên trang vmdb

1970 births
Living people
People from Haiphong
20th-century Vietnamese male singers